Face of Evil is a 1996 American television film starring Tracey Gold as Darcy Palmer, Perry King as Russell Polk and Shawnee Smith as his daughter Jeanelle Polk.

Plot
Darcy Palmer (Gold) is a promising young artist. On the night before her wedding, she empties her fiancé's bank account and runs to New York. On the way, she meets Brianne Dwyer (Mireille Enos), a young woman who is on her way to her first year in college. Darcy murders Brianne and assumes her identity, enrolling in college in Brianne's place. Mary Lambert directs.

References

External links
 

1996 television films
1996 films
1990s thriller films
Films about identity theft
CBS network films
Films directed by Mary Lambert
American thriller television films
1990s American films